The Canton of Saint-Cyprien is a former canton of the Dordogne département, in France. It was disbanded following the French canton reorganisation which came into effect in March 2015. It had 7,054 inhabitants (2012). The lowest point is 45 m in the commune of Coux-et-Bigaroque, the highest point is in Bézenac at 317 m, the average elevation is 96 m.  The most populated commune was Saint-Cyprien with 1,581 inhabitants (2012).

Communes
The canton comprised the following communes:

Allas-les-Mines
Audrix
Berbiguières
Bézenac
Castels
Coux-et-Bigaroque
Les Eyzies-de-Tayac-Sireuil
Marnac
Meyrals
Mouzens
Saint-Chamassy
Saint-Cyprien
Saint-Vincent-de-Cosse
Tursac

Population history

See also 
 Cantons of the Dordogne department

References

Saint-Cyprien
2015 disestablishments in France
States and territories disestablished in 2015